Hima is a town in the Western Region of Uganda. It is an industrial town, involved primarily in the manufacture of cement.

Location
Hima is located in Kitswamba Parish, Busongora County, Kasese District, in Western Uganda. The coordinates of the town are:0°17'26.0"N, 30°10'39.0"E (Latitude:0.290556; 30.177500).

Population
The 2002, the national population census gave the population of Hima at 7,075 people. In 2014, the national population census and household survey, enumerated the towns population at 13,135. The Uganda Bureau of Statistics (UBOS), estimated the mid-year population in 2019, at 14,700. The table below illustrates the same data in a tabular format.

Economy
The town is the headquarters of Hima Cement Limited, the second-largest manufacturer of cement in Uganda, producing about  annually. Hima Cement is a subsidiary of LafargeHolcim, a Swiss conglomerate, that manufactures building materials, with subsidiaries in about 80 countries around the globe, with about 72,500 employees. Hima Cement is the largest employer in town, with 320 permanent employees and about 200 contractors at the company headquarters. The company maintains another factory at Tororo, in the Eastern Region of Uganda, with equivalent production capacity.

Transport
The Fort Portal–Kasese–Mpondwe Road passes through the town in a north to south direction.

See also
 Kasese District
 Rwenzururu
 Western Region, Uganda
 List of cities and towns in Uganda
 Economy of Uganda

References

External links
 Hima Cement Factory Expands to Double Production

Populated places in Western Region, Uganda
Cities in the Great Rift Valley
Kasese District
Rwenzururu sub-region